Radical 42 or radical small meaning "small" or "insignificant" is one of the 31 Kangxi radicals (214 radicals total) composed of three strokes.

In the Kangxi Dictionary, there are 41 characters (out of 49,030) to be found under this radical.

 is also the 36th indexing component in the Table of Indexing Chinese Character Components predominantly adopted by Simplified Chinese dictionaries published in mainland China. Its inversed form  is the associated indexing component affiliated to the principal indexing component .

Evolution

Derived characters

Literature

External links

Unihan Database - U+5C0F

042
036